Mill is an unincorporated community in Ste. Genevieve County, in the U.S. state of Missouri.

History
A post office called Mill was established in 1882, and remained in operation until 1906. The community was so named for a mill at the original town site.

References

Unincorporated communities in Ste. Genevieve County, Missouri
Unincorporated communities in Missouri